The enzyme oxalomalate lyase catalyzes the chemical reaction

3-oxalomalate  oxaloacetate + glyoxylate

This enzyme belongs to the family of lyases, specifically the oxo-acid-lyases, which cleave carbon-carbon bonds.  The systematic name of this enzyme class is 3-oxalomalate glyoxylate-lyase (oxaloacetate-forming). This enzyme is also called 3-oxalomalate glyoxylate-lyase.  This enzyme participates in glyoxylate and dicarboxylate metabolism.

References

 

EC 4.1.3
Enzymes of unknown structure